20th Division or 20th Infantry Division may refer to


Infantry divisions
 20th Division (German Empire), 1866-1919
 20th Infantry Division (Wehrmacht), Germany, 1934–1945
 20th Waffen Grenadier Division of the SS (1st Estonian), 1944–1945
 20th Infantry Division (Greece), 1941
 20th Infantry Division (India), 1942–1945
 20th Infantry Division Friuli, Kingdom of Italy, 1939–1944
 20th Division (Imperial Japanese Army), 1915–1945

 20th Infantry Division (Poland), 1920–1939
 20th Division (Spain), 1937-1939
 20th (Light) Division, United Kingdom, 1914–1919

Armoured divisions
 20th Panzer Division (Wehrmacht), Germany, 1940–1945
 20th Armoured Division (Greece), formed 1956

 20th Armored Division (United States), 1943–1946

Aviation divisions
 20th Air Division, United States, 1955–1960; 1966–1967; 1969–1983

See also
 20th Regiment (disambiguation)